Zahi Armali (born 25 October 1957) is a former Arab-Israeli footballer. He started his career at Maccabi Shefa-'Amr, and a holder of many records at Maccabi Haifa.

Early life and career
Armali was born and raised in Shefa-'Amr, Israel, to an Arab-Christian family. He started his professional career at Maccabi Shefa-'Amr. After a few years he spent playing in the lower leagues he signed a contract with Maccabi Haifa in 1983.

During his seven-season career at Maccabi Haifa, Zahi won three championships. He remains the club's record goalscorer with 90 league goals in 179 games.

After the 1989 season Zahi left Maccabi Haifa and subsequently played for Hapoel Jerusalem, Hapoel Haifa and his hometown club Maccabi Shefa-'Amr, where he finished his professional career as a player.

References

External links
 Zahi Armali Maccabi Haifa 

1957 births
Living people
Israeli footballers
Arab citizens of Israel
Arab-Israeli footballers
Israeli Arab Christians
Israel international footballers
Maccabi Haifa F.C. players
Hapoel Jerusalem F.C. players
Hapoel Tzafririm Holon F.C. players
Hapoel Haifa F.C. players
Maccabi Ahi Nazareth F.C. players
Maccabi Ironi Tamra F.C. players
Liga Leumit players
Footballers from Shefa-'Amr
Association football forwards
Israeli Football Hall of Fame inductees